Regestrum Varadinense, or Oradea Register, is a document which preserved the minutes of hundreds of trials by ordeal. The ordeals were held under the auspices of the canons of the cathedral chapter of Várad (now Oradea in Romania) in the first decades of the 12th century. It is "one of the most remarkable documents of social history in medieval Transylvania", according to historian Florin Curta.

Footnotes

Sources 

 
 
 

Legal history of Hungary
13th century in Hungary
13th-century documents
Medieval legal texts
Medieval Transylvania